Lycia zonaria, the belted beauty, is a moth of the family Geometridae. The species was first described by Michael Denis and Ignaz Schiffermüller in 1775 and it is found in most of Europe.

Distribution
Lycia zonaria is found from central Europe, east to the Russian Urals. The populations in England and Wales are ssp. britannica, those from the Urals are ssp. rossica . The nominate subspecies is found in the south west of Spain and France, but is missing in the Mediterranean. The northern occurrence ranges to Denmark and southern Sweden.

Description
The wingspan is 27–30 mm. Females are wingless. Males are variable, but always easy to recognize. Characteristic are the dark veins and broad dark distal area, bounded proximally and traversed by sharply white lines. The female is distinguished by its yellowish abdominal belts. The rudimentary white wings are common to the genus.

Biology
Adult males are on wing from March to April.

The larvae feed on a range of low-growing plants, including Salix repens and Rosa pimpinellifolia.

The species is a typical resident of dry grassland, occurring at forest edges, sandy slopes and heaths.

Subspecies
Lycia zonaria zonaria
Lycia zonaria rossica (Harrison, 1910)
Lycia zonaria britannica (Harrison, 1912)

External links

Belted beauty at UKMoths
Fauna Europaea
Lepiforum e.V.

Bistonini
Moths of Europe
Moths of Asia
Taxa named by Michael Denis
Taxa named by Ignaz Schiffermüller
Moths described in 1775